In professional wrestling, championships are competed for in pre-planned matches as part of scripted storylines. This article is a list championships retired by the wrestling company Ring of Honor (ROH) and previously competed for by the promotion's roster of contracted wrestlers.

Defunct championships promoted by ROH 
This section of championships are a list of titles which were exclusive to ROH.

Past championships used by ROH

See also
List of Ring of Honor pay-per-view events
List of Ring of Honor personnel

References

External links

Former championships
Former championships